The 2004 National Indoor Football League season was the fourth season of the National Indoor Football League (NIFL). The league champions were the Lexington Horsemen, who defeated the Sioux Falls Storm in Indoor Bowl IV.

Standings

 Green indicates clinched playoff berth
 Purple indicates division champion
 Grey indicates best conference record

Playoffs

References

National Indoor Football League seasons
National Indoor Football League Season, 2004